Pe Thet Khin was the Minister for Health of Myanmar (Burma), and a practicing paediatrician. He previously served as Professor of Child Health in University of Medicine, Mandalay. Later he served as the rector of the University of Medicine-1, Yangon. In 2011, he became the Minister of Health in Thein Sein's government. But he resigned on 29 July 2014.

Publications

Bringing Health Research to the Renewed U.S.-Myanmar Relationship, June 2012, Science & Diplomacy

References

Burmese paediatricians
University of Medicine 1, Yangon alumni
Health ministers of Myanmar
Year of birth missing (living people)
Living people